Simon of Elmham (died 8 June 1257) was a medieval Bishop-elect of Norwich.

Life
Simon was Prior of Norwich from 1235. He was elected to the see of Norwich about 9 November 1236 but his election was quashed by Pope Gregory IX on 17 January 1239 after King Henry III appealed to the pope and the case was heard by the papal legate Cardinal Otto of Tonengo.

Simon retained the office of prior and died while still prior on 8 June 1257.

Citations

References
 British History Online Bishops of Norwich accessed on 29 October 2007
 British History Online Priors of Norwich accessed on 29 October 2007
 

Bishops of Norwich
1257 deaths
Year of birth unknown
13th-century English Roman Catholic bishops